Charles Kingsley Barrett  (4 May 1917 – 26 August 2011) was a British biblical scholar and Methodist minister. He served as Professor of Divinity at the University of Durham and wrote commentaries on the Acts of the Apostles, John, Romans, 1 Corinthians and 2 Corinthians.

Early life and education
Barrett was born in Salford, and studied at Shebbear College, Devon, Pembroke College, Cambridge, and Wesley House in Cambridge.

Career
Barrett was ordained to the ministry in the Methodist Church, and appointed lecturer in divinity at the University of Durham in 1945, where he was elected professor in 1958. He also preached on a regular basis in the Darlington circuit of the Methodist Church and more widely.

Barrett has been described as standing alongside C. H. Dodd as "the greatest British New Testament scholar of the 20th century" and "the greatest UK commentator on New Testament writings since J. B. Lightfoot".

Honours
Barrett was elected a Fellow of the British Academy (FBA) in 1961, and was awarded its Burkitt Medal in 1966. He served as president of the Society for New Testament Studies in 1973.

In 1982, a Festschrift was published in his honour. Paul and Paulinism: Essays in Honour of C.K. Barrett included contributions from Morna Hooker, F. F. Bruce, I. Howard Marshall, Martin Hengel, and John Painter.

Selected works

References

1917 births
2011 deaths
20th-century Christian biblical scholars
Academics of Durham University
Alumni of Pembroke College, Cambridge
Arminian ministers
Arminian theologians
Bible commentators
British biblical scholars
English Methodist ministers
Fellows of the British Academy
Methodist biblical scholars
New Testament scholars
People educated at Shebbear College
People from Salford